Eta Island may refer to:

 Eta Island (Palmer Archipelago) in Antarctica
 Eta Island in the Simpson Strait, Canada
 Eta Island, Bermuda in the North Atlantic Ocean